Paul Robert may refer to:
Paul Robert (lexicographer) (1910–1980), French lexicographer
Paul Robert (fencer), Swiss Olympic fencer
Léo-Paul Robert (1851–1923), Swiss painter

See also

Paul Roberts (disambiguation)